Harry Mordecai Freedman (17 October 1901 – 4 December 1982) was a rabbi, author, translator, and teacher. Among his more famous contributions are his translations done for several tractates of the Talmud, Midrash Rabbah, and Encyclopedia Talmudit.

Biography
Freedman was born in Vitebsk, Russia in 1901. His family moved to England and he grew up in London. He studied at the Etz Chaim Yeshiva, received a BA from the University of London, semicha from Jews College, and a PHD from the university of London
(in 1923, 1924, and 1930 respectively). 
He served in pulpit positions in England, Australia, and the United States, and served as a teacher at Yeshiva University.

Family
Freedman was father in law to prominent Melbourne lawyer, Arnold Bloch.

Published works

Translations
Freedman made several significant contributions as a translator.
 Eight volumes of the Babylonian Talmud as part of the Soncino English edition of the Talmud.
 Midrash Rabbah (10 volumes), with Maurice Simon.
 Several volumes of Menachem Mendel Kasher's Torah Sheleimah, called The Encyclopedia of Biblical Interpretation in English.
 Encyclopedia Talmudica, the English edition of Encyclopedia Talmudit.
 Israel Passover Haggadah, an English Translation of Kasher's הגדה ארצישראלית

Books
 One Hundred Years: The Story of the Melbourne Hebrew Congregation 1841-1941 (1941)
 He wrote the commentary for the biblical books of Genesis, Joshua and Jeremiah for the Soncino Books of the Bible
 A commentary on the Pentateuch, published posthumously in 2001.

References

1901 births
1982 deaths
20th-century English rabbis
British Orthodox rabbis
Australian Orthodox rabbis
Alumni of the London School of Jewish Studies
Emigrants from the Russian Empire to the United Kingdom
British emigrants to Australia
20th-century Australian rabbis
20th-century American rabbis